Krčava is a village and municipality in the Sobrance District in the Košice Region of east Slovakia.

History
In historical records the village was first mentioned in 1302.

Geography
The village lies at an altitude of 129 metres and covers an area of 8.735 km².
It has a population of about 435 people.

Culture
The village has a public library, a gym and a football pitch.

External links
 
https://web.archive.org/web/20080111223415/http://www.statistics.sk/mosmis/eng/run.html 
http://en.e-obce.sk/obec/krcava/krcava.html

Villages and municipalities in Sobrance District